William Arthur Poole (1902–1964) was an English footballer who played in the Football League for Coventry City, Merthyr Town, Walsall, Watford and Stoke.

Career
Poole was born in West Bromwich and played non-league football with Kidderminster Harriers before joining Merthyr Town in 1921. He played 11 times before the Welsh side before earning a move to Stoke in April 1922. He played in the remaining six matches of the 1921–22 season as Stoke gained promotion to the First Division, but Poole only managed the same number of matches the following season and left for Watford. He spent two seasons with the "Hornets" before spending a short spell at a number of teams which included, Coventry City, Kidderminster Harriers, Yeovil & Petters United, a return to Merthyr Town, Wellington Town, Stourbridge, Walsall and Dudley Town.

Career statistics
Source:

Honours
 Stoke City
 Football League Second Division runner-up: 1921–22

References

1902 births
1964 deaths
Sportspeople from West Bromwich
English footballers
Association football utility players
Kidderminster Harriers F.C. players
Merthyr Town F.C. players
Stoke City F.C. players
Watford F.C. players
Coventry City F.C. players
Yeovil Town F.C. players
Telford United F.C. players
Stourbridge F.C. players
Walsall F.C. players
Dudley Town F.C. players
English Football League players
Association football forwards